The Praia Cape Verde Temple is a temple of the Church of Jesus Christ of Latter-day Saints (LDS Church) in Praia, Cape Verde.

History 
The intent to construct the temple was announced by church president Russell M. Nelson on October 7, 2018. The Praia Cape Verde Temple was announced concurrently with 11 other temples. At the time, the number of the church's total number of operating or announced temples was 201 with this announcement.

On May 4, 2019, a groundbreaking to signify beginning of construction was held, with Paul V. Johnson, who was then president of the church's Europe Area, presiding. On March 3, 2022, the LDS Church announced that a public open house would be held from May 21 through June 11, 2022, excluding Sundays. The temple was dedicated on June 19, 2022 by Neil L. Andersen.

See also 

 The Church of Jesus Christ of Latter-day Saints in Cape Verde
 Comparison of temples of The Church of Jesus Christ of Latter-day Saints
 List of temples of The Church of Jesus Christ of Latter-day Saints
 List of temples of The Church of Jesus Christ of Latter-day Saints by geographic region
 Temple architecture (Latter-day Saints)

References

External links 
 Church Newsroom of The Church of Jesus Christ of Latter-day Saints
 Praia Cape Verde Temple at ChurchofJesusChristTemples.org

Temples (LDS Church) in Europe
Proposed religious buildings and structures of the Church of Jesus Christ of Latter-day Saints
The Church of Jesus Christ of Latter-day Saints in Africa
Religious buildings and structures in Cape Verde
21st-century Latter Day Saint temples
Proposed buildings and structures in Cape Verde